The Fuerte de la Concepción y del Triunfo (Fort of the Conception and the Triumph), also known as Fuerte de Nuestra Señora de la Concepción del Triunfo (Fort of Our Lady of the Conception of Triumph), Fort of Misamis, and Triunfo Fort, is a citadel first built by Spanish Jesuit priest and commander José Ducos as a Spanish fortress in the old town of Misamis (now known as the modern city of Ozamiz) in the island of Mindanao. 

The fort is an important historical landmark of the area as it symbolizes the city's cultural heritage. Outside of the fort's south wall is the Archdiocesan Marian Shrine of the Birhen sa Cotta, which is dedicated to the city's patron, Nuestra Señora de la Inmaculada Concepción y del Triunfo de la Cruz de Migpangi. The shrine is a well known pilgrimage site in city.

Background
The fort is square in shape, with one of its side is facing the bay while the opposite side is facing the city. The fort has 4 bastions (baluarte), namely San Fernando, San Jose, Santiago and San Ignacio. The fort's material is mostly blocks made from a mixture of coral and sandstone joined together by lime. The stones were a common material used in buildings and these were mostly abundant in the nearby Panguil Bay and islands.

 
At the fort's entrance is a large gate that was added during the fort's renovation. The gate features a bas relief of Saint James (Santiago in Spanish), adorned on its façade.

History

Construction

1754 was known back then as a time of great suffering for the people living in coastal towns and villages in southern Luzon, Visayas and Mindanao. Marauding pirates would appear, with no warning, and would burn the houses, crops, and carry away as many of the people as they could catch in order to be sold as slaves in Maguindanao, Sulu, Borneo or Indonesia. This problem led to the creation of a flotilla by the Spanish government, and a Spanish Jesuit missionary, Father José Ducos, was appointed as its commander in order to counter this scourge. After several victorious battles and when some peace was restored, it was decided to construct a stone fort at the mouth of Panguil Bay as a form of protection against future attacks.

Construction of the fortress soon began in 1756. However, due to limited money for the payment of workers and transport of materials, the fort took a long time to finish. The fort also served as shelter for the ships of the Spanish fleet during that time.

Because of the fort's benefit to the town, Misamis became the most important town in Northern Mindanao in the 18th and early 19th centuries. Misamis was then made the capital of the District of Misamis when Mindanao was originally divided into five districts, until during the 1870s when the seat of government was transferred to Cagayan de Oro.

Naming of the fort
Father Ducos belonged to a society that had a special devotion to the Blessed Virgin Mary, under her title of the Immaculate Conception. The fort and the town was therefore put under her patronage, which led to the fort being officially called Fuerte de la Concepción y del Triunfo.

The "Triunfo" (Triumph) was the name of the leading vessel in the battles that cleared the harbor of Misamis and Panguil Bay of pirates. It was named in honor of the "Triunfo de la Cruz", the decisive battle in which the united Christian armies of Spain defeated the Moors at Las Navas de Tolosa in the year 1212. In thanksgiving for that victory, the Spaniards celebrated a special feast on July 16 called Triunfo de la Cruz (Triumph of the Cross).

Patronage
 
During or after the fort's construction, the image of the Nuestra Señora dela Inmaculada Concepción y del Triunfo de la Cruz de Migpangi arrived at Misamis. Father Ducos then placed the fort under her patronage and enshrined the image in a chapel inside the walls. Outside the fort's southern wall is a bas relief of the Virgin, which is facing the bay.

The wooden image was kept in the fort until sometime between 1875 and 1884 when it was transferred to the nearby parish church (now the Metropolitan Cathedral of the Immaculate Conception Ozamiz) by fray Jorge Carcabilla, the Spanish priest that was assigned in Misamis at the time, as both the chapel and the image was not properly taken care of.

Sometime in the late 1950s, a mad person hacked the two century old bas relief to pieces using a bolo. A devotee set up a plaster replica of the image on its stead, and is still being venerated today.

World War II
During World War II, Wendell Fertig established the command headquarters of the growing guerrilla resistance to the Japanese occupation of Mindanao in the Spanish fort in the city on October 1942 during the Japanese occupation in Misamis. However, his headquarters was abandoned on June 26, 1943, in the face of a large Japanese attack. The fort was captured and garrisoned by a contingent of Japanese soldiers who dug foxholes near and under the walls. This undermining of the walls later lead to the destruction of the southwest bastion in a 7.4-magnitude earthquake of 1955.

Cotta today
Today, the fort is now a known tourist and pilgrimage destination. It is also now divided into three parts: Cotta Shrine, Cotta Garden (the inside), and Cotta Beach. The outdoor Marian Shrine area was formerly a gate, which is now closed and walled in. Inside the fort is a garden, where it features a small museum that holds precious artifacts from the fort and the city. On the southeast bastion is a 9 meter (30 ft) tall, concrete lighthouse that was erected around 1917.  The lighthouse has a focal plane of 17 meters (55 ft) and it has two red flashes every 10 seconds.

The fort was renovated and restored to its original design in 2002. The fort was also declared as a National Historical Landmark on March 13, 2002 by the National Historical Commission of the Philippines. On July 16, 2006, the Philippine Postal Corporation issued stamps of the fort in commemoration of its 250th anniversary. The Cotta Garden and Beach is currently undergoing renovations.

Gallery

References

Buildings and structures in Ozamiz
Forts in the Philippines
Spanish colonial infrastructure in the Philippines
Spanish Colonial Fortifications of the Philippines
Marked Historical Structures of the Philippines
Misamis Occidental
Roman Catholic shrines in the Philippines
Ozamiz